James Morosini (born July 5, 1990) is an American actor and filmmaker. He is best known for writing, directing, and starring in I Love My Dad, which Morosini based on his own experiences. Morosini is also known for his roles in The Sex Lives of College Girls, Loosely Exactly Nicole, Foursome, and others.

Morosini was born and raised in Tampa, Florida, the son of Deborah Morosini and Claudio Lichtenthal, a ski instructor. His maternal aunt was actress Dana Reeve. He earned a bachelor's degree from the USC School of Cinematic Arts.

Filmography

Film

Television

References 

Living people
1990 births
Male actors from Florida
Male actors from Tampa, Florida
USC School of Cinematic Arts alumni
University of Southern California alumni